Christof Wetterich (born in 1952) is a German theoretical physicist.

Biography
Born in Freiburg, Wetterich studied physics in Paris, Cologne and Freiburg, where he received his PhD in 1979. He worked at CERN in Geneva and DESY in Hamburg. Since 1992 he has a chair for theoretical physics at Ruprecht-Karls-Universität Heidelberg. His major research interests are cosmology and particle physics. The development of the theoretical method of functional renormalization by Wetterich has found applications in many areas of physics, e.g. it provides a suitable framework to study quantum gravity (asymptotic safety), Yang-Mills theories and it was also useful in non-relativistic quantum systems like the BCS to BEC crossover where it bridges the two theories in a unified theoretical language.

Wetterich is best known for his proposal of dynamical dark energy or quintessence in 1987. This could explain the observed accelerated expansion of the Universe. He has done fundamental work for the theoretical understanding of tiny masses of neutrinos The method of functional renormalization relates macro physical structures to micro physical laws in a continuous way. Its modern form is based on the exact Wetterich equation.

Honours and awards
Wetterich received the Max-Planck Research Prize in 2005. Since 2006 he is member of the Heidelberg Academy of Sciences.

References

External links 
 Christof Wetterich's homepage at the Institute for Theoretical Physics at Heidelberg University
 Scientific publications of Christof Wetterich on INSPIRE-HEP

1952 births
Living people
20th-century German physicists
Theoretical physicists
People associated with CERN